Roys Branch is a stream in Buchanan County in the U.S. state of Missouri.

Roys Branch was named after John B. Roy, an early citizen.

See also
List of rivers of Missouri

References

Rivers of Buchanan County, Missouri
Rivers of Missouri